Gregory Henderson (born 10 September 1976) is a New Zealand former professional track and road racing cyclist, who rode professionally between 2002 and 2017. His career includes winning the  scratch race at the 2004 world championships and, in road cycling, winning the points competition at the Tour de Georgia in 2005 and 2008.

Henderson rode in five Olympic Games and completed 11 Grand Tours. He also competed in four Commonwealth Games and was a four-time medallist, including winning gold in the points race in 2002. During an important part of his career, he served as André Greipel's main lead-out man, and they were colleagues at both  and later .

In addition to 17 New Zealand track and road titles and eight World Cup track golds, Henderson has been New Zealand Track Cyclist of the Year (2001, 2002, 2003) and Athlete of the Year, Otago, New Zealand (2001, 2002, 2003).

Career

Track cycling
At the 1998 Commonwealth Games Henderson won bronze medals in the  points race and the  team pursuit.

He won gold in the  points race and bronze again in the  team pursuit at the 2002 Commonwealth Games.

He won the  scratch race at the 2004 UCI Track Cycling World Championships.

At the 2004 Summer Olympics he finished fourth in the points race and seventh in the madison.

His best placing in the 2006 Commonwealth Games was 10th in the scratch race.

At the 2008 Summer Olympics he finished tenth in the points race and the madison.

Road cycling
In 2005, he won the points competition at the Tour de Georgia and International Tour de Toona. In 2006, he recovered from early injuries and won the inaugural Pro Cycling Tour (PCT) Reading Classic.

In 2009, he won the Clásica de Almería in Spain, the second stage of Vuelta Ciclista a Murcia, and the third stage of the Vuelta a España on his Grand Tour debut.

In 2010, he won the first stage of the Paris–Nice. In 2011, he won stage 2 of Paris–Nice and stage 3 of the Tour of California.

Henderson left Team Sky at the end of 2011, and joined , mainly to act as lead-out man for Andre Greipel. He credited his success in this role to the positioning skills which he developed as a track rider, and having to compete against quicker road sprinters such as Greipel, Mark Cavendish and Marcel Kittel. In April 2015, he expressed his opinion on Twitter that Fabio Aru of rival team  missed the Giro del Trentino not because of illness as it was announced, but because he had an ongoing investigation into his biological passport for doping. Henderson apologised shortly after. He competed in the 2016 Tour de France.

In August 2017 Henderson announced his retirement from competition, having competed in his last race, the 2017 Colorado Classic, and indicated that he would move into full-time coaching, having trained athletes since 2014. The following month he was announced as Endurance Performance Director for USA Cycling.

Personal life
He is married to the Australian cyclist Katie Mactier. He has a bachelor's degree in Physical Education from the University of Otago.

Major results

Road

1996
 1st  Time trial, National Road Championships
1997
 1st  Time trial, National Under-23 Road Championships
1998
 1st  Time trial, National Under-23 Road Championships
1999
 1st  National Criterium Championships
 Tour of Wellington
1st Stages 3 & 10
2000
 1st Stage 2 Tour of Wellington
 National Road Championships
2nd Road race
2nd Time trial
 2nd Omloop van de Vlaamse Scheldeboorden
2001
 1st  National Criterium Championships
 1st Stage 5 Bay Classic Series
2002
 1st Tour de Loveland
 10th First Union Invitational
2003
 1st Stage 7 Tour of Southland
2004
 1st  National Criterium Championships
 Tour of Southland
1st  Points classification
1st Stages 1 (TTT), 8 & 10
2005
 1st  National Criterium Championships
 1st Wachovia Invitational
 International Tour de Toona
1st  Points classification
1st Stages 2 & 7
 1st  Sprints classification Tour de Georgia
 5th Overall Tour of Southland
1st Stages 1 (TTT), 4, 9 & 10
2006
 1st Philadelphia International Championship
 1st Reading Classic
 1st Stage 7 Tour of Wellington
 1st Stage 5 Tour of Southland
 2nd Overall Bay Classic Series
1st Stage 1
 6th Road race, Commonwealth Games
2007
 5th Overall Tour of Qatar
2008
 Tour de Georgia
1st  Sprints classification
1st Stages 3 & 7
 7th Scheldeprijs
2009
 1st Clásica de Almería
 1st Stage 3 Vuelta a España
 1st Stage 2 Vuelta a Murcia
 1st Stage 7 Volta a Catalunya
 2nd Philadelphia International Championship
 5th Overall Three Days of De Panne
2010
 1st Down Under Classic
 Tour of Southland
1st Stages 1 (TTT), 4 & 9
 1st Stage 1 Paris–Nice
 1st Stage 3 Ster Elektrotoer
 1st Stage 4 Eneco Tour
 2nd Overall Bay Classic Series
1st Stage 2
 3rd Overall Tour Down Under
 3rd Overall Tour of Britain
1st  Points classification
1st Stage 2
 4th Scheldeprijs
2011
 1st Stage 2 Paris–Nice
 1st Stage 3 Tour of California
 National Road Championships
2nd Road race
3rd Time trial
 3rd Paris–Bourges
2012
 1st Stage 1 Bay Classic Series
 7th Kampioenschap van Vlaanderen
 9th Down Under Classic
2013
 2nd Overall Bay Classic Series
 3rd Down Under Classic
2014
 1st Stage 2 Ster ZLM Toer
 3rd Ronde van Limburg
 4th Overall World Ports Classic
 7th Road race, Commonwealth Games
2015
 2nd Overall Bay Classic Series
1st Stage 4
 10th Down Under Classic
2016
 6th Overall Presidential Tour of Turkey

Grand Tour general classification results timeline

Track

1998
 Commonwealth Games
3rd  Points race
3rd  Team pursuit
1999
 National Championships
1st  Team pursuit
1st  Points race
 UCI World Cup Classics, Mexico City
2nd Team pursuit
3rd Madison
2000
 1st  Team pursuit, National Championships
 2nd Six Days of Nouméa
2001
 Goodwill Games
1st Points race
1st Madison
 1st  Points race, National Championships
2002
 Commonwealth Games
1st  Points race
3rd  Team pursuit
 UCI World Cup Classics, Sydney
1st Team pursuit
1st Madison
3rd Points race
2003
 1st  Madison, National Championships
 UCI World Cup Classics, Sydney
1st Scratch
3rd Points race
 2nd Madison, UCI World Championships
2004
 1st  Scratch, UCI World Championships
 UCI World Cup Classics, Aguascalientes
2nd Scratch
2005
 2004–05 UCI Track Cycling World Cup Classics, Sydney
1st Team pursuit
3rd Scratch
 2nd Scratch, UCI World Championships
2006
 Oceania Games
1st Points race
1st Scratch
 1st  Points race, National Championships
 2006–07 UCI Track Cycling World Cup Classics, Sydney
2nd Points race
2007
 Oceania Championships
1st  Madison
2nd Points race
2nd Scratch
 2007–08 UCI Track Cycling World Cup Classics, Sydney
1st Points race

References

External links
 
 

1976 births
Commonwealth Games bronze medallists for New Zealand
Commonwealth Games gold medallists for New Zealand
Cyclists at the 1996 Summer Olympics
Cyclists at the 1998 Commonwealth Games
Cyclists at the 2000 Summer Olympics
Cyclists at the 2002 Commonwealth Games
Cyclists at the 2004 Summer Olympics
Cyclists at the 2006 Commonwealth Games
Cyclists at the 2008 Summer Olympics
Cyclists at the 2012 Summer Olympics
People educated at Otago Boys' High School
Living people
New Zealand male cyclists
New Zealand Vuelta a España stage winners
Olympic cyclists of New Zealand
University of Otago alumni
Sportspeople from Dunedin
UCI Track Cycling World Champions (men)
Commonwealth Games medallists in cycling
New Zealand track cyclists
Competitors at the 2001 Goodwill Games
Medallists at the 1998 Commonwealth Games
Medallists at the 2002 Commonwealth Games